Olof "Olle" Zetherlund (24 August 1911 — 2 October 1974) was a Swedish footballer. He made one appearance for Sweden national football team. Zetherlund became Allsvenskan top scorer in 1937 with AIK.

References

Swedish footballers
Sweden international footballers
IFK Stockholm players
Djurgårdens IF Fotboll players
AIK Fotboll players
1911 births
1974 deaths
Allsvenskan players
Association football midfielders